Eriogonum latifolium is a species of wild buckwheat known by the common names seaside buckwheat and coast buckwheat. This plant is native to the coastline of the western United States from Washington to central California, where it is a common resident of coastal bluffs and scrub.

Description
Eriogonum latifolium is a perennial herb which is variable in size. Its height is dependent in part on its degree of exposure to the stiff maritime winds of its habitat. It can be very small or sprawl to a maximum height of 70 centimeters. Its pale white-green leaves are oval, woolly, sometimes waxy, and mostly basal. The leaves can extend up if there is an erect stem.

At the end of each branch is a cluster of pinkish flowers. Flowers can also be white or red in color.

References

External links

Jepson Manual Treatment
Photo gallery

latifolium
Flora of California
Flora of Oregon
Flora of Washington (state)
Natural history of the California chaparral and woodlands
Natural history of the San Francisco Bay Area
Garden plants of North America
Drought-tolerant plants
Butterfly food plants
Flora without expected TNC conservation status